The Adelaide United W-League 2011–12 season was Adelaide United's fourth season in the W-League.

Technical staff

Players

Squad

Transfers

In

Out

Squad statistics

Fixtures

Standings

References

External links
 Official club website
 W-League Match Centre Round 1
 W-League Match Centre Round 2

2011-12
2011–12 W-League (Australia) by team